The Toggenburger  or Toggenburg is a Swiss breed of dairy goat. Its name derives from that of the Toggenburg region of the Canton of St. Gallen, where it is thought to have originated. It is among the most productive breeds of dairy goat and is distributed world-wide, in about fifty countries in all five inhabited continents.

History 

The Toggenburger is the traditional goat breed of the Toggenburg and Werdenberg regions of the Canton of St. Gallen in eastern Switzerland. The herd-book was started in 1890. At first, the goats were often dark-coated, sometimes with white markings; there may have been some cross-breeding with Appenzell and Chamois-coloured stock in neighbouring areas. The typical mouse-grey colour with white facial markings was fixed by selective breeding in the twentieth century.

The Verein Ziegenfreunde is an association of owners of the goats within their historic area of origin.

British Toggenburgs are heavier and have improved milk quality. By the middle of 2002, 4146 Toggenburgs had been registered with the New Zealand Dairy Goat Breeders Association.

Characteristics 

The Toggenburger is of medium size. Coat colour ranges from light brown to mouse grey, with white Swiss markings to the face, lower legs and tail area. Tassels may be present; billies and nannies may be naturally horned or polled (hornless).

Use 

It is a highly productive dairy breed.

References 

Dairy goat breeds
Goat breeds originating in Switzerland